Daniel J. Kaniewski is an American government official who served as the acting deputy administrator of the Federal Emergency Management Agency. He also served as the deputy administrator of FEMA for resilience.

Career 
Earlier in his career, Kaniewski served as director of response and recovery policy and later as special assistant to the president for homeland security and senior director for response policy in the White House Office. Kaniewski began his career in homeland security as a firefighter and paramedic.

Prior to being confirmed by the United States Senate for his role at FEMA, Kaniewski was vice president for global resilience at AIR Worldwide, a catastrophe risk modelling and consulting services firm, and a senior fellow at George Washington University's Center for Cyber and Homeland Security. He has also served as the mission area director for resilience and emergency preparedness/response at the Homeland Security Studies and Analysis Institute and as an adjunct assistant professor at the Georgetown University School of Foreign Service.

References

External links
 
 Faculty profile at Georgetown University

Living people
Georgetown University alumni
George Washington University alumni
Trump administration personnel
Federal Emergency Management Agency officials
Year of birth missing (living people)